Bells of San Juan is a 1922 American silent Western film directed by Scott Dunlap and starring Buck Jones. It was based on the Jackson Gregory novel The Bells of San Juan.  It was the first of five films where Claude Payton was cast alongside Jones.

Plot
Buck Jones plays Roderick Norton, a sheriff on a crusade to find and apprehend the man who murdered his father.  Unable to restore order in the mining town where he is appointed, he loses favor with the townspeople.  The villain, revealed to be Jim Garson (Claude Payton) and his gang make life miserable for Norton, culminating with the abduction of his girlfriend, frontier doctor Dorothy Page (played by Fritzi Brunette), by Garson's henchmen the Rickard brothers, in order to entrap the hero.  Roderick is successful in rescuing Dorothy, but in the process he suffers a head injury which changes his personality, turning him into a thief whom his friends are unable to trust.  He is brought back to his old self through the medical ministrations of Dorothy, and is able to obtain a confession regarding the murder of his father from the Rickards, allowing the capture and arrest of Garson.

Reception
Motion Picture News reviewed the film on October 28, 1922.  It found the plot entirely predictable, and thought that it was one of Jones' weaker films.

Cast
 Charles "Buck" Jones as Roderick Norton
 Fritzi Brunette as Dorothy Page
 Claude Payton as Jim Garson
 Harry Todd Dr. Caleb Patton
 Hardy Kirkland as John Engel
 Katherine Key as Florrie Engel
 William Steele as Kid Rickland
 Otto Matieson as Antone
 Sid Jordan as Tom Cutter

References

External links
 
 

1922 films
1922 Western (genre) films
American black-and-white films
Films directed by Scott R. Dunlap
Fox Film films
American silent short films
Silent American Western (genre) films
1920s American films